THEM! is a fictional gang of hippies who terrorized the streets of New York and battled Wonder Woman. The main members of the gang consisted of Top Hat, Moose Momma and Pinto. They first appeared in Wonder Woman #185 (November 1969), and were created by Mike Sekowsky and Dick Giordano.

Fictional team history

Diana Prince returned to her boutique one night to find a young blonde girl, Cathy Perkins, who screams, "Oh, dear GOD -- I thought you were THEM!"

The three hippies find Cathy hiding in Diana's shop, and Top Hat (the leader) throws a dog collar across the floor and orders Cathy to put it on. Diana demands the hippies leave the store, and asks Cathy to explain herself.

While Cathy bathes, she explains that her parents did not understand her, and she had begun to feel stifled at home. She had decided to run away to the city to find freedom and space to think for herself. Diana asks her if she had found what she was looking for, and Cathy shakes her head, replying that all she had found was THEM!

She had arrived in the city and had begun to look for a place to live. She had then met the three hippies who had offered her a room in their apartment. Things seemed fine for a few days. Then her clothes and money began to disappear. The gang told her she could still stay with them, but a few days later changed their minds and said that Cathy would have to work for her room. They made her do everything (cook, clean, wash the clothes, etc.) First though, Top Hat would put the dog collar on her and beat her (the scars on her back were noticed by Diana when she was dressing). Top Hat had told Cathy that a dog beaten regularly knows its place and becomes a good dog.

The three hippies never let her alone. But one day, when she was alone with just Moose Momma, the hippie had taken some pills and fallen asleep. Seeing her chance, Cathy had removed her collar and made her escape, running and running until she eventually found an open back window into Diana's Boutique.

The gang continued to try to reclaim Cathy on several occasions, and vandalized Diana's store and merchandise. They did appear to be intimidated by Tony Petrucci, a local man.

One night, as Diana was contacting the Missing Persons Bureau (hoping to reunite Cathy with her parents), they set fire to Diana's boutique, and Diana and Cathy escaped. Diana and Cathy stayed with Tony and his mother that night, but in the morning, Diana discovered Cathy (who felt guilt over the fire) returned to the gang. Diana prepared to confront the gang, and Top Hat demanded Diana put on the collar. Suddenly, Tony and several men attack the gang, and Diana demands that Top Hat is hers. She attacks Top Hat, and smashes her head first into a nearby wall. Diamonds and jewelry spill out of her broken hat, and she and the rest of the gang are soon arrested.

Cathy is reunited with her parents, and becomes Diana's assistant. The gang does not appear again.

Members
 Top Hat - The leader of the gang wears a costume that is a cross between a pimp, circus ringleader and Victorian opera goer (a green suit paired with a frilly yellow top and contrasted by a purple cape and top hat). She runs the gang and traps her slaves in collars.
 Moose Momma - The muscle of the gang is a large woman who wears biker's clothing accented with gold costume jewelry.
 Pinto - The third main member of the gang, dresses like a cowboy from the Old West.
 The gang has other various unnamed members throughout their territory, as well as a male ally named Mingo who attacks Diana and Cathy on the streets.

Creation

Wonder Woman editor/writer/penciler Mike Sekowsky once stated that he fully intended for these characters to be perceived as disturbingly kinky homosexual women. He also revealed that he came up with this lesbian-less cover design to avoid attracting the undue attention of the Comics Code Authority.

Other versions

Wonder Woman: Black and Gold
THEM! appears in the anthology series Wonder Woman: Black & Gold. In the story "Whatever Happened to Cathy Perkins?" by Sina Grace, Top Hat, Moose Momma and Pinto briefly fight Wonder Woman after being summoned to the Mod-ly Modern boutique by a magical artifact.

See also
 List of Wonder Woman enemies

References

External links
Amazon Archives - Wonder Woman #185
Gay League - Looking Back at Wonder Woman #185

Comics characters introduced in 1969
DC Comics LGBT supervillains
DC Comics supervillain teams
Fictional lesbians
Fictional organizations
Wonder Woman characters
DC Comics female supervillains
Characters created by Mike Sekowsky